Stephen's Tower is a tower located on Citadel Square in Baia Mare, Romania.

Eventually used for strategic observation and detecting fires, Stephen's Tower was initially a bell tower for Saint Stephen's church, built in 1347-76 as the only double-naved church in mediaeval northwest Transylvania. The church (50.6 m long and 19 m wide, with naves 25 m long), though not quite finished, was dedicated in 1387, when it was first mentioned as St. Stephen's. The bell tower was added in 1446 on the church's southwest side; it was begun during John Hunyadi's reign in honour of his 1442 victory over the Ottomans near the Ialomiţa River and completed in 1468 under his son Matthias Corvinus.

In the mid-16th century the tower and church were partly destroyed by powerful lightning. The tower was rebuilt in 1559-61; the church passed from Roman Catholic to Reformed control in 1588. In 1619 both structures underwent a thorough restoration: the tower received a new roof, high and sharp-pointed, in the shape of a square-based pyramid. In 1628 four mechanical clocks with moons (one on each face), manufactured by a Prešov clockmaker, replaced the tower's bell. Another lightning-induced fire in 1647 devastated the church and tower. Yet another fire seriously damaged both structures when they were again hit by lightning in 1769. The tower was rebuilt the following year, when the gallery was raised a level and the roof redone in Baroque onion-dome style. The church was in ruins and repairs estimated to be very costly, so the authorities decided to demolish its remaining walls in 1847 using gunpowder; the former church site became a park in 1856, with Ferenc Schulz's 1870 plan for rebuilding it remaining unimplemented, and only the bell tower remained standing. This was destroyed by fire in 1869 and rebuilt in 1898-99 in neo-Gothic style, a form it preserves to this day.

The aged light green slate roof was damaged by a storm in 2007; repairs, finished the following year at a cost to the city of some €200,000, included its replacement with a copper roof. The tower is open to visitors.

References

External links
 "Turnul Sf. Ştefan", Maramureș County Museum
 "Arhitectura municipiului Baia Mare", Baia Mare City Hall
 Marina Glodici, "Turnul Ştefan, simbol al municipiului Baia Mare cu o istorie zbuciumată" ("Stephen's Tower, Symbol of the City of Baia Mare with a Turbulent History"), eMaramureș.ro, 4 July 2007
 Anca Popescu, "De ce poartă Turnul Ştefan 'capişon de cupru'" ("Why Stephen's Tower Wears a 'Copper Hood'"), Estrada Maramureșeana, 8 March 2008

Buildings and structures completed in 1446
Towers completed in 1899
Buildings and structures in Baia Mare
Historic monuments in Maramureș County
Towers in Romania
Tourist attractions in Maramureș County